William Reierson Arbuthnot (b. 14 Upper Wimpole Street, London 28 January 1826 - d. 31 May 1913) was a British businessman and legislator. He served as a member of the Madras Legislative Council from 1861 to 1864 and 1866 to 1870. He worked with Arbuthnot & Co and was Chairman of the Bank of Madras and the Chamber of Commerce of Madras and Director of Commercial Union Insurance Co and of the Midland Bank Ltd.

Personal life 

Willy Arbuthnot was born on 28 January 1826 to George Arbuthnot and Elizabeth Fraser of Plawhatch, Sussex. He belonged to the Scottish Arbuthnot family that was involved in business in Madras. 

Willy married Mary Helen Anstruther, the eldest daughter of Philip Anstruther, the Colonial Secretary of Ceylon on 9 December 1858. The couple had eight sons and six daughters. One of their sons was (William) Reierson Arbuthnot who also worked in India.

References

External links
 

1826 births
1913 deaths
British people in colonial India
William Reierson
Members of the Madras Legislative Council